Paul Brough may refer to:

Paul Brough (conductor) (born 1963), English conductor
Paul Brough (footballer) (born 1965), English professional footballer